Sir Stephen Augustus Lovegrove  (born 30 November 1966) is a British civil servant who was appointed as UK National Security Adviser with effect from the end of March 2021, having previously served as the Permanent Secretary of the Ministry of Defence.

Early life

Lovegrove was born in 1966, the second child of John and Zenia Stewart Lovegrove. His father was a Warwickshire industrialist and entrepreneur. Lovegrove was educated at Warwick School and at Corpus Christi College, Oxford, where he was awarded a first class degree in English in 1989.

Career

Between 1990 and 1994 Lovegrove worked for Hydra Associates, a strategic media consultancy. In 1995, he joined Deutsche Morgan Grenfell (subsequently Deutsche Bank), where he remained until 2004 and became head of the European media team.

In April 2004, he joined the Shareholder Executive, becoming acting Chief Executive on 27 June 2007 and Chief Executive on 18 April 2008. In that capacity, he was also appointed to the Board of the London Organising Committee of the Olympic Games and Paralympic Games and acted as chairman of (the no longer trading) British Nuclear Fuels Ltd.

He was appointed as Permanent Secretary of the Department of Energy and Climate Change with effect from 4 February 2013. In March 2016, after three years in that post, the Government announced his appointment as Permanent Secretary of the Ministry of Defence.

Since February 2016 he has also served as a non-executive director of Grosvenor Britain & Ireland, one of the principal operating companies of the Grosvenor Group.

Lovegrove was appointed Companion of the Order of the Bath (CB) in the 2013 New Year Honours and Knight Commander of the Order of the Bath (KCB) in the 2019 Birthday Honours. He is an Honorary Fellow of Corpus Christi College, Oxford.

In January 2021 it was announced that Lovegrove would become National Security Adviser at the end of March 2021. The announcement came as David Frost was pulled out from assuming the role seven months after being appointed.

Lovegrove has been criticised by Conservatives including Jacob Rees-Mogg for endorsing Black Lives Matter, which Lovegrove claims is not a political organisation. In late 2021, Lovegrove authored a document titled "Mission Critical" telling MI5 and MI6 employees to check their "white privilege" and avoid words such as "manpower", "strong" and "grip".

Personal life

In 1997, Lovegrove married the screenwriter Kate Brooke. They have two daughters and live in London.

Sources

 Who's Who (2009 edition)
 Shareholder Executive web-site (accessed on 22 April 2010)
 L.O.C.O.G. web-site (accessed on 22 April 2010)

References

People educated at Warwick School
Alumni of Corpus Christi College, Oxford
English civil servants
Knights Commander of the Order of the Bath
1966 births
Living people
Permanent Under-Secretaries of State for Energy and Climate Change
Permanent Under-Secretaries of State for Defence